The AACTA Award for Best Film is an award presented by the Australian Academy of Cinema and Television Arts (AACTA), a non-profit organisation whose aim is to "identify, award, promote, and celebrate Australia's greatest achievements in film and television". The award is presented at the annual AACTA Awards, which hand out accolades for achievements in feature film, television, documentaries and short films. From 1969 to 2010, the category was presented by the Australian Film Institute (AFI), the Academy's parent organisation, at the annual Australian Film Institute Awards (known as the AFI Awards). When the AFI launched the Academy in 2011, it changed the annual ceremony to the AACTA Awards, with the current award being a continuum of the AFI Award for Best Film.

From 1969 to 1975, the award was presented as a gold, silver, bronze or grand prix prize, or in some years, a cash prize. The first winner, Jack and Jill: A Postscript, was nominated in the "general" category of the 1969 awards, and received a silver prize. Because non-feature films dominated the Australian film industry at that time, the film was submitted in the general category. Despite this, it is considered the first winner by the Academy. From the 1976 Australian Film Awards, the award became competitive, and has been given as such since then.

To be eligible, the film must be Australian; consist of a dramatised story of at least 70 minutes duration; and be publicly exhibited in a commercial cinema for a minimum of seven consecutive days, in at least two capital cities (one of which is Sydney or Melbourne). The producer of the film is considered the nominee, and is presented the award upon winning.

Winners and nominees
In the following table, the years listed correspond to the year of film release; the ceremonies are usually held the same year. Films in bold and in dark blue background have received a gold, silver, bronze or grand prix prize, or a cash prize; those in bold and in yellow background have won a regular competitive award. Films that are neither highlighted nor in bold are the nominees. When sorted chronologically, the table always lists the winning film first and then the other nominees.

Notes

A: From 1958–2010, the awards were held during the year of the films release. However, the 1974–75 awards was held in 1975 for films released in 1974 and 1975, and the first AACTA Awards were held in 2012 for films released in 2011.
B: Jack and Jill: A Postscript received a silver prize, and was nominated in the "general category" in 1969.
C: Three to Go: Michael received the Grand Prix award for the film in 1970.
D: Homesdale was the winner of the Grand Prix award in 1971, and was the last film to receive this prize.
E: Stork was awarded the Australian Film Development Corporation Award for the Best Fiction Film over 65 minutes, and was given a five-thousand dollar cash prize.
F: Libido: The Child and 27A were joint recipients of the gold prize for fiction in 1973.
G: Sunday Too Far Away won the golden reel prize, and an additional A$5000, at the 1974–75 Awards.
H: Although not considered to be nominees, Petersen and Between Wars won the silver and bronze prizes, respectively. They are not highlighted in dark blue, in order not to confuse the reader in regards to who the winner is, and in order of precedence gold was always the highest honour, followed by silver then bronze.

Further reading

References

External links
 Official website of the Australian Academy of Cinema and Television Arts

Film
Awards for best film
Lists of films by award
Awards established in 1969
1969 establishments in Australia